Crinkle-cutting is slicing that leaves a corrugated surface.

Waffle fries

Pommes gaufrettes, grid fries, waffle fries, crinkle-cut or criss-cross fries are fries obtained by quarter-turning the potato before each pass over the corrugated blade of a mandoline and deep-frying.  This increases the surface area relative to the volume, exposing a larger area to the cooking process and allowing more water vapor to escape, resulting in a product that is crisper, and perhaps tastier as more of it is subject to the browning and flavor-producing effects of the Maillard reaction which takes place during cooking.

Gallery

References

cutting techniques (cooking)
french fries